Mahipar Power dam is located 40 km from Kabul city. This dam was built in 1952 with the cooperation of Germany and has 3 turbines with a power of 66 MW.  Currently, one of its turbines is active with a capacity of 19 megawatts, the rest is worn out.  This dam does not have a natural water reservoir and water is extracted from the bottom by the water pump, which is extracted from the speed of this electricity.

References 

Dams in Afghanistan